Thomas Brittain Vacher (1805–1880) was a British lithographer, legal stationer, and printer.

He founded Vacher's Parliamentary Companion, a parliamentary reference work which continues to this day as Vachers Quarterly, published by Dods.

Biography
Vacher was the son of the stationer Thomas Vacher of Parliament Street, Westminster, where he was born. He went into business with his brother George; the third son Charles Vacher was known as an artist. Thomas Brittain Vacher was himself an amateur artist. He married in 1850.

Vacher was the author of Brief Prayers for Travellers (1868). His son, the architect Sydney Vacher, designed the elaborate pulpit in St Margaret's church, Westminster as a memorial to him.

References

1805 births
1880 deaths
19th-century lithographers
English lithographers
English printers
19th-century British printmakers
19th-century English businesspeople